Microcystis  is a genus of small air-breathing land snails, terrestrial pulmonate gastropod mollusks in the subfamily Microcystinae in the family Euconulidae, the hive snails.

Species

 Microcystis adusta H. B. Baker, 1938
 Microcystis albisuturalis K. C. Emberton, Slapcinsky, Campbell, Rakotondrazafy, Andriamiarison & J. D. Emberton, 2010
 Microcystis ambinanifae Emberton, 1994
 Microcystis andersoni H. B. Baker, 1938
 Microcystis andriamahajai Emberton & Pearce, 2000
 Microcystis anosiana Fischer-Piette, Blanc, C.P., Blanc, F. & Salvat, 1994
 Microcystis argueyrolli Fischer-Piette, Blanc, C.P., Blanc, F. & Salvat, 1994
 Microcystis arnali Fischer-Piette, Blanc, C.P., Blanc, F. & Salvat, 1994
 Microcystis aspera H. B. Baker, 1938
 Microcystis basampla Emberton & Pearce, 2000
 Microcystis benesculpta H. B. Baker, 1938
 Microcystis blanci Emberton & Pearce, 2000
 Microcystis buckorum H. B. Baker, 1938
 Microcystis castanea Emberton & Pearce, 2000
 Microcystis celestinae Emberton & Griffiths, 2009
 Microcystis charpentieri Fischer-Piette, Blanc, C.P., Blanc, F. & Salvat, 1994
 Microcystis compacta Emberton & Pearce, 2000
 Microcystis dyakana Godwin-Austen, 1891
 Microcystis erasmi Fischer-Piette, Blanc, C.P., Blanc, F. & Salvat, 1994
 Microcystis esetra Emberton & Pearce, 2000
 Microcystis esnaulti Fischer-Piette, Blanc, C.P., Blanc, F. & Salvat, 1994
 Microcystis excavata (Fischer-Piette, Blanc, F. & Salvat, 1975)
 Microcystis fosbergi H. B. Baker, 1938
 Microcystis fotsifotsy K. C. Emberton, Slapcinsky, Campbell, Rakotondrazafy, Andriamiarison & J. D. Emberton, 2010
 Microcystis grodji Fischer-Piette, Blanc, C.P., Blanc, F. & Salvat, 1994
 Microcystis hainanica Yen, 1939
 Microcystis ilapiriensis Emberton & Pearce, 2000
 Microcystis josephinae Emberton & Griffiths, 2009
 Microcystis kendrae Emberton & Griffiths, 2009
 Microcystis kondoi H. B. Baker, 1938
 Microcystis kremenae Emberton, 1994
 Microcystis lenticula H. B. Baker, 1938
 Microcystis madecassina (Fischer-Piette, Blanc, F. & Salvat, 1975)
 Microcystis mahermanae Emberton & Pearce, 2000
 Microcystis michellae Emberton & Griffiths, 2009
 Microcystis minensis Möllendorff, 1885
 Microcystis minutis Yen, 1939
 Microcystis navachi Fischer-Piette, Blanc, C.P., Blanc, F. & Salvat, 1994
 Microcystis nitelloides Fischer-Piette, Blanc, F. & Salvat, 1975
 Microcystis oraka Emberton, 2003
 Microcystis ornatella (Beck, 1838)
 Microcystis palmicola Stoliczka, 1873
 Microcystis perahui H. B. Baker, 1938
 Microcystis platysma Emberton, 1994
 Microcystis sahavondrononae Emberton, 1994
 Microcystis saintjohni H. B. Baker, 1938
 Microcystis soa Emberton & Griffiths, 2009
 Microcystis stenomphala Möllendorff, 1884
 Microcystis subangulata Emberton & Pearce, 2000
 Microcystis subplanata Emberton & Pearce, 2000
 Microcystis tangens Fischer-Piette, Blanc, F. & Salvat, 1975
 Microcystis townsendiana (Godwin-Austen & G. Nevill, 1879)
 Microcystis tsara Emberton & Griffiths, 2009
 Microcystis tsingia Emberton, 2003
 Microcystis viaregina Emberton, 1994
 Microcystis vohimenae Emberton & Pearce, 2000
 Microcystis vohimenoides Emberton & Pearce, 2000
 Microcystis vony K. C. Emberton, Slapcinsky, Campbell, Rakotondrazafy, Andriamiarison & J. D. Emberton, 2010

References

 Baker, H. B. (1938). Zonitid snails from Pacific Islands. Part 1. Southern genera of Microcystinae. Bernice P. Bishop Museum bulletin. 158: 1-102, 20 pls.

External links
  Beck, H. H. (1838). Species novarum in indice molluscorum praesentis aevi musei Principis Christiani Frederici ab autore propositarum characteres breves. Hafniae
 Albers, J. C.; Martens, E. von. (1860). Die Heliceen nach natürlicher Verwandtschaft systematisch geordnet von Joh. Christ. Albers. Ed. 2. Pp. i-xviii, 1-359. Leipzig: Engelman

 
Euconulidae
Gastropod genera